Norodom Sihamoni (born 14 May 1953) is King of Cambodia. He became King on 14 October 2004, a week after the abdication of his father, Norodom Sihanouk. He is the eldest son of Norodom Sihanouk and former Queen Consort Norodom Monineath and was Cambodia's ambassador to UNESCO, prior to his selection by a nine-member throne council to become the next king. Before ascending to the throne, Sihamoni was educated in Czechoslovakia and was known for his work as a cultural ambassador in Europe and as a classical ballet instructor.

Early life

Name and family

Sihamoni was born on Thursday, 14 May 1953, in Phnom Penh, Cambodia. His given name "Sihamoni" comprises two morphemes from his parents' given names "Sihanouk" and "Monineath". At the time of his birth and that of his younger brother, his mother Princess Monique of Khmer, French and Corsican descent, had been one of King Norodom Sihanouk's consorts after being a constant companion since the day they met in 1951, when she won first prize in a national beauty contest.

The queen was granted the title of Neak Moneang and the name of Monineath at the time of her marriage to King Norodom Sihanouk in 1952. Furthermore, Queen Monineath is a step-granddaughter of the late Prince Norodom Duong Chakr of Cambodia, and the daughter of Pomme Peang and of her second husband, Jean-François Izzi, a Corsican banker.

Sihamoni has 14 half-brothers and half-sisters by his father; his only full sibling, a younger brother, Samdech Norodom Narindrapong, was born in 1954 and died in 2003.

Education and life abroad
The then Prince Sihamoni first began his education in 1959, where he attended Norodom School, followed by Lycée Descartes School in Phnom Penh, developing a keen interest in the arts early on in his life.

In 1962 the young Sihamoni was sent to Prague in Czechoslovakia by his father to study abroad. There, he completed his early education at Majakovskeho Primary School and later at Ostrovni Elementary School. When he was in his preadolescence years, he starred in a production of Pyotr Tchaikovsky’s The Nutcracker at the prestigious Prague National Theatre, where he pursued private ballet and piano classes and was once even selected for a television rendition of Brundibár, a well-known children's opera. He then concluded his secondary education at the National Prague Conservatory and was regarded as an able student, getting high marks. Here, he further developed his interest in the performing arts, undertaking courses in this field and excelling at the top of his class. Furthermore, he attained great fluency in Czech. A movie directed by Vladimir Sís was shot about the prince in Prague in 1967, under the name The Other Little Prince (Jiný malý princ). The prince would occasionally visit his homeland for holidays of which when he did, he involved himself in Cambodia's arts and cultural scene, including starring in a film made by his father and performing ballet. During the 1970 Cambodian coup d'état by Lon Nol, Sihamoni remained in Czechoslovakia.

Between 1971 and 1975, Sihamoni completed his higher education in classical dance and music at the Academy of Performing Arts in Prague, culminating with the attainment of a Master's degree for which he wrote a thesis titled The Conception and Administration of Artistic Schools in Cambodia. After graduation in 1975 he left Prague and began to study filmmaking in North Korea.

Return to Cambodia
However, in 1976, Sihamoni was forced to come back to Cambodia after having been deceived by the Khmer Rouge with a forged telegram, undersigned by King Sihanouk ordering his return. Immediately, the ruling Khmer Rouge regime headed by Pol Pot turned against the monarchy, and put the royal family including Sihamoni, his brother Prince Norodom Narindrapong, his mother Queen Norodom Monineath, his father King Norodom Sihanouk under house arrest in the Royal Palace during much of the period of Democratic Kampuchea. The consequent Cambodian genocide saw several members of the wider royal family killed and Sihamoni and his immediate family lived in daily fear for their lives, effectively shut off from the outside world. With the 1979 Vietnamese Invasion, which ousted the Khmer Rouge, the family was airlifted to China and Sihamoni subsequently worked as a secretary for his father.

Career
In 1981 Sihamoni moved to France to teach ballet as a professor of classical dance and artistic pedagogy, a position which he held for almost two decades, at various conservatoires, including the Marius Petipa Conservatory, the Gabriel Faure Conservatory and the W.A. Mozart Conservatory. He was also later president of the Khmer Dance Association there. He lived in France for nearly 20 years and continued his pursuit in the arts, including establishing 'Ballet Deva', an original dance troupe, in which he served as its General Manager and Artistic Director, alongside heading the Royal Khmer Cinematic Corporation. During this time, he undertook monkhood under the auspices of Samdech Bour Kry, who would later become a supreme patriarch of Cambodia.

In the early 1990s, Cambodia's Supreme National Council, which was recognized by United Nations Security Council Resolution 668 as part of the transitional process in the country pursuant to the 1991 Paris Peace Agreements, unanimously selected Prince Sihamoni as its permanent representative to the United Nations. The year 1993 saw the prince being appointed Cambodia's permanent representative to UNESCO in Paris, a role he held right until he became King in 2004. In this role he became known for his hard work and devotion to Cambodian culture. He had previously refused an appointment as Cambodia's ambassador to France.

Reign

Accession and coronation
On 14 October 2004 Sihamoni was selected by a special nine-member council, part of a selection process that was quickly put in place after the surprise abdication of King Norodom Sihanouk a week before, given there was no provisions at that time in Cambodia's constitution that covered the subject of abdication. Prince Sihamoni's selection was endorsed by Prime Minister Hun Sen and the then National Assembly President Prince Norodom Ranariddh (Sihamoni's half-brother), both members of the throne council. King Sihanouk backed the decision as well. Sihamoni was said to have been reluctant to take on the role, but nevertheless accepted it in the national interest, returning on 20 October to Phnom Penh, accompanied by his parents, King-Father Norodom Sihanouk and Queen-Mother Norodom Monineath, to an estimated 100,000 people who lined their motorcade route from Phnom Penh International Airport to the Royal Palace to welcome the soon-to-be King.

He was then inaugurated and formally appointed as King on 29 October 2004 in a coronation ceremony centered at the Royal Palace in the capital. The coronation was noted for its relative simplicity, which was specifically requested by King-Father Sihanouk. King Sihamoni himself did not want the ceremonies to be too lavish because he did not wish for the impoverished country to spend too much money on the event, opting for a more modest affair. In a break with precedent, Sihamoni did not assume his seat on the higher, elevated throne nor did he wore the gold-and-diamond monarchial crown that came with the royal regalia. In his first speech as monarch, he acknowledged words of wisdom imparted to him by his father and pledged to be a king of the people by saying: 

On 29 October 2014, there were celebrations to mark the 10th anniversary of his coronation. Well-wishers representing different cross sections of the kingdom's population congregated outside the royal palace to commemorate the occasion and pay their respects to the King.

Privy advisory council
On 12 December 2008, Sihamoni selected twenty-six members of the Cambodian royal family to his advisory court, among them his half-brother and former Prime Minister Prince Norodom Ranariddh as chief advisor and president of the council. Other choices included Prince Sisowath Sirirath, Princess Norodom Marie (estranged wife of Prince Ranariddh) and Prince Sisowath Thomico. The King's half-sister and Cambodia's former Ambassador to Malaysia, Princess Norodom Arunrasmy and uncle, Prince Norodom Sirivudh were also duly appointed members. The appointments was seen at the time by observers as signaling the cessation of royal family members participating in politics as theoretically, the constitution did not allow individuals to concurrently serve in both the royal court and government. Indeed, royalism has long been a staple in Cambodian political history, with periods where royalist parties had once governed the country, such as the Sangkum of then-Prince Sihanouk in the 1950s and 1960s and the FUNCINPEC party of Prince Ranariddh in the 1990s. Responding to the commentary, some ruling party officials and members of the royal family insisted that there was no agenda behind the move, and that it should not be construed as the prohibition or end of royal political involvement, despite the influence and electoral success of royalist political parties having waned significantly over time.

Philanthropy

King Sihamoni's reign has been focused on the wellbeing of the Khmer people. He has been described by some as a humble monarch because of his philanthropic endeavours. For example, in 2010, in the aftermath of the tragic stampede at Koh Pich in the capital that saw hundreds killed and injured, he reached out to the victims and their families, donating money to every household who had lost a family member in the incident, as well as financially supporting those who were injured. Another example was in 2016, where he donated a record-breaking $6.5 million from the proceeds that was gained from the selling of the royal residence in Koh Kong to the Kantha Bopha Foundation, which oversees a group of nationally renowned children’s hospitals. Furthermore, in 2018, upon learning about the situation of people affected by flooding in the provinces, he contributed essential goods to over 500 Cambodian families. 

At times, he has even assisted his fellow citizens first-hand during adverse events, such as venturing out into flooded areas and handing out goods to victims directly. Additionally, Sihamoni reportedly donates to the Cambodian Red Cross on a regular basis and has authorized royal grants for infrastructure, schools, orphanages, struggling communities, religious institutions, people affected by a disability, rehabilitation centres, mental health organizations, and sponsoring student's trips among others. His philanthropy extends in the international context as well, like for instance, after Hurricane Katrina, the King made a personal good-will donation to victims of the storm.

Amidst the global COVID-19 pandemic, King Sihamoni, alongside Queen Mother Norodom Monineath has donated well over $1 million to the Royal Government of Cambodia's efforts to address the situation in Cambodia, inspiring a concerted public campaign across the country. Moreover, the King has made contributions in the provision of essential supplies, including donations of food, water and face masks to Cambodians severely impacted by COVID-19. In July 2022, he contributed $500,000 towards ongoing demining efforts in the nation, which is still plagued by problematic landmines leftover from decades of conflict.

Political role
The King rarely gets involved in the Cambodian political space, in conformance with his position as a constitutional monarch and is considered to be 'above politics'. Some Cambodian opposition figures, however, have called for him to be more vocal and directly involved in the political issues of the country, like his predecessor, King-father Norodom Sihanouk was, contending that the King has the constitutional prerogative to do so, in terms of powers accorded to him. Conversely, others have cautioned against this notion, citing that the constitution strictly warrants for a predominantly ceremonial monarch that “reign, but shall not govern”, noting that resorting to political intervention is neither in the long-term interests of the monarchy nor nation, and Sihamoni since the outset of his reign, has pledged and adhered to a largely apolitical stance. Indeed, during the monarchical selection process, King Sihanouk touted then Prince Sihamoni's neutral and impartial approach to politics as a key trait for why he is suited to the role. This is reinforced by analysis from observers that Sihamoni "has represented both continuity and change - withdrawing royalty from active politics, but advancing it as a symbol of national reconciliation", thereby restoring the "monarchy's traditional role as an ‘umbrella’ under which Cambodians could unite." In turn, observers argue that this limits any politicization of the monarchy as an institution whilst maintaining its neutrality as well as legitimacy, especially amid the context of the sometimes controversial and turbulent nature of Cambodian politics.

Bilateral border dispute
Nevertheless, there has been several occasions where Sihamoni’s reluctance to be involved in the political arena have been tested. In 2005, in the first major political challenge of his reign, it was reported that he was hesitant to authorize the royal assent for the government’s plans to give effect to a controversial border treaty with neighbouring Vietnam, which was compounded by his predecessor, King-father Sihanouk's objection. This apparently caused tension with the government after Prime Minister Hun Sen expressed frustration about the royal assent delay to the point that abolition of the monarchy was suggested. Sihamoni eventually signed the treaty, after having been assured by government and legislative officials as well as other members of the royal family, that no land would be ceded to Vietnam as a result of the promulgation of the bilateral treaty.

Political pardons
In 2006, at the government’s petition, he granted a pardon to leading opposition politicians, namely Sam Rainsy and Cheam Channy, who originally had their parliamentary immunity annulled and were facing charges viewed as politically motivated. In regards to Rainsy, he was embroiled in a legal dispute with Prime Minister Hun Sen, over the 1997 grenade attack incident on a political rally, which injured Rainsy, as he was giving a speech. He had accused Prime Minister Sen of being involved, an accusation that the Prime Minister denies, though Rainsy later expressed regret in making the claim. As for Channy, he was designated as a prisoner of conscience by Amnesty International, where he was convicted for fraud and in attempting to conspire to overthrow the government. At the time, the move by Sihamoni was founded to be encouraging by international observers as it indicated a conciliatory gesture that points to a reduction of political tensions and restoration of multi-party democracy in the country.

In 2009, Sihamoni upon considering the appeals made to him for the review of the conviction verdict against opposition-affiliated journalist and editor, Hang Chakra who was jailed on charges of “criminal disinformation”, sought the government's support for a prospective royal pardon. The appeals were made to him in his capacity as a member of the Supreme Council of the Magistracy. This request was reportedly rejected by the government for reasons not stated, but it was eventually later accepted, of which Sihamoni went on to grant a full pardon to Chakra in 2010.

General election 2013 and aftermath

In the lead-up to the 2013 Cambodian general election, Sihamoni at the request of the government, granted a royal pardon which enabled then Opposition Leader Sam Rainsy, who had been in self-imposed exile since 2009, to partake in the election which was welcomed by the United Nations. Prior to the pardoning, Rainsy had founded himself in legal jeopardy once again due to another politically-motivated charge brought against him arising from an incident in 2009. 

When the election outcome became disputed between the ruling Cambodian People's Party (CPP) and opposition Cambodia National Rescue Party (CNRP), the subsequent aftermath resulted in the 2013–2014 Cambodian protests. Consequently, in what is regarded as the first time he had intervened directly to try to resolve a political dispute, the King attempted to play a mediating role and urged for national reconciliation, by exercising his moral authority to facilitate talks between the two party leaders, Rainsy and Prime Minister Hun Sen, imploring a de-escalation of tensions and for the parties to find common ground towards a resolution regarding their issues, which eventually they settled. 

After this, Sihamoni encouraged the two sides to "continue to work together for the sake of stability, development and national unity" and for a time, there was a 'culture of dialogue' between the rival political parties. This period of dialogue was relatively short-lived as tensions soon manifested again that culminated in the dissolution of the CNRP in late 2017 and the reallocation of the party’s seats that they won in the general election to other political parties in concurrence with the gradual persecution of members associated with the CNRP.

Controversial legislations
In the same year, a piece of legislation was introduced, named the Political Parties Law, that human rights organisations saw was a means of further curtailing the power of the opposition in the run-up to the 2018 Cambodian general election. When it came to the formalization of this law through the required royal assent, Sihamoni was coincidentally overseas, thereby delegating the royal assent duties to the President of the Senate, who constitutionally serves as the acting head of state in the King’s absence. This then prompted speculation as to whether there was an underlying reasoning behind the timing of his overseas trip. Around the same time, as the legislative processes was taking place to enact this law, a letter emerged, of which Sihamoni had encouraged for all Cambodians to vote without intimidation ahead of the 2017 communal elections.

Similarly, in February 2018, in relation to the Lèse-majesté Law, which too had concerns expressed about it by various observers, speculation was fuelled again, when the King did not directly sign this legislation into law, due to a planned foreign trip. Some analysts maintained that this did not merely occur by chance, though others advised that such assumptions are not grounded in facts, without any confirmation. Regardless, commentators noted that it added to a perception that Sihamoni tends to be overseas to avoid having to give his signature to highly contentious legislations and that such trips are supposedly timed, which then trigger a delegation of responsibility to the next constitutional office holder. It is theorized that the reason for this is that caught between the dilemmas of his position to concurrently not politically interfere and to also serve as a political guarantor, these absences are a way for the King to meet a middle ground through the “symbolic denial of royal legitimacy.”

Elections 2018 and developments
In 2018, after the general election and senate election, which saw the ruling CPP retaining power, winning virtually every seat in both houses of parliament, much to the consternation of members of the now-dissolved opposition, international observers and human rights groups, whom all voiced unease about the deteriorating state of political affairs in the country, not least, the lack of a viable opposition, Sihamoni convened the opening of the national legislature. He had urged parliamentarians in both the National Assembly and Senate to protect the rights of all Cambodians and seek ways to bring about national unity and in bettering the lives of the overall populace, whilst highlighting the nation's long path towards peace and development. Several Western countries boycotted the opening, but the King noted in his speech that the opening of parliament was nonetheless constitutionally mandated.

In recent years, again at the request of the government, he has approved political clemency requests for several former members of the dissolved CNRP to participate in politics again, like for example in 2020, with respect to former chief whip Son Chhay and in 2021, with Pol Ham, who was a deputy party president. Both Chhay and Ham were amongst at least 32 former CNRP political figures, as of February 2022, that the King has politically rehabilitated.  Sihamoni, also had granted a royal pardon for Rainsy’s deputy and later successor, Kem Sokha who had defamation charges against him stemming from an alleged adultery, though his separate treason charge still remains. Aside from the CNRP related cases aforementioned, other high-profile pardons include that of land rights activist Tep Vanny and Australian filmmaker James Ricketson.

Elections 2022 and ASEAN summitry
In the 2022 communal elections, he reiterated his call for all eligible Cambodians to participate in the civic process by exercising their right to vote, and to “not worry about oppression, threats or intimidation from any person or party at all”, something that he had previously urged a few years back in the 2017 communal elections. Several political parties expressed appreciation for the King’s public appeal. The communal elections result saw a victory for the ruling CPP, although the Candlelight Party, which has links with the dissolved CNRP, made some relatively surprising gains.

At the ASEAN summit in November 2022, Sihamoni hosted regional leaders at the royal palace where he reinforced Cambodia’s commitment to the bloc of nations and emphasized the continued importance of inter-state collaboration in addressing contemporary issues. Later, at the interrelated 43rd General Assembly of the ASEAN Inter-Parliamentary Assembly, he further touched upon several topics. This included the centrality of peace in relation to socio-economic development, healthcare and educational investment, concern regarding the Myanmar conflict, the impact of increasing tensions between global powers, the threat of nuclear weapons, climate change, and the lingering effects of the COVID-19 pandemic.

General election 2023
In February 2023, several months ahead of the July general election, Sihamoni once again advocated, as he has done in prior years, for electoral participation amongst the public and for free and fair elections to take place. His call was backed by the National Election Committee whom urged the citizenry to heed the King's message, despite insinuations of bias levelled against him by former opposition leader Rainsy. These claims were roundly rejected and condemned by government officials, including multiple cabinet ministers.

Cultural advocacy

Sihamoni also remains an ardent advocate for Cambodian arts and culture. For instance, in 2006, when he was designated by the International Theatre Institute as its 'Message Author' for International Dance Day, he extolled the symbolism and virtue of dance, with reference to the Royal Ballet of Cambodia. In 2012, he presided over the opening of L'ombrello di Beatocello, a documentary film by Georges Gachot showcasing the life's work of famed Swiss pediatrician, Beat Richner. Likewise, in 2017, he did the same at the global premiere of acclaimed Cambodian-based film, First They Killed My Father, documenting the experiences of Loung Ung, a survivor of the Khmer Rouge and directed by Oscar-winning actress Angelina Jolie, whom he had earlier hosted, along with her family at The Royal Residence in Siem Reap prior to the occasion.

The King is a strong proponent of buddhism and of the integral place it maintains in the cultural life of the Khmer nation, and he usually officiates key festivals on the Buddhist calendar. Moreover, he supports the work of the country's Ministry of Culture and Fine Arts whom reportedly engages regularly in consultations with him on advancing their overall strategic agenda. Additionally, as King, he presides over the annual Bon Om Touk, a major festive cultural event on the yearly calendar with ancient roots dating back to the Khmer Empire, in conjunction with other traditionally important national events like for example, Independence Day, the Royal Ploughing Ceremony, and Khmer New Year.

Furthermore, Sihamoni has been commended for his dedication to archaeological preservation, conservation and research, with specificity to Cambodia. In particular, as Honorary President of ICC-Angkor (International Coordination Committee for the Safeguarding and Development of Historic Site of Angkor), King Sihamoni places special emphasis on the efforts to protect this national symbol and treasure, engaging frequently with the body's work through fulfilling representative functions or routine briefings given directly to him or via a delegated senior representative. In 2011, he attended the completion ceremony pertaining to restoration works at the Baphuon historical temple in Angkor. In late 2021, he championed Cambodia's bid for the proposed inclusion of Koh Ker, an ancient Khmer archaeological site, alongside Bokator, one of the kingdom's oldest martial arts on the UNESCO Intangible cultural heritage and World Heritage Site lists.

Overseas visits

In the international arena, his first official foreign trip as King was to China in 2004, where he met with President Hu Jintao, indicative of a strong friendship long established from the days of his father between China and the Cambodian royal family. Here, he routinely also undertakes bi-yearly visits to Beijing for general medical check-ups, though in a private capacity. In 2015, he attended the United Nations COP21 summit, and gave an impassioned speech highlighting the impact of the climate crisis on Cambodia and urging international efforts on this front to be expedited. He represented Cambodia at the 2019 UNESCO Conference on Dialogue of Asian Civilizations (CDAC) in Beijing aimed at enhancing regional cooperation and intercultural exchange. Other notable trips include to Japan, where he was the first Cambodian sovereign since the monarchical restoration of the 1990s to visit, his "second homeland" of the Czech Republic where he spent his childhood, and France, Cambodia's former colonial power.

Public image
In contrast to his father, former King Norodom Sihanouk's "mercurial" reign, commentators note that Sihamoni has maintained a relatively "quiet" and "low-key" profile, albeit stable reign. Nonetheless, leading national leaders across the political spectrum recognize the King as a unifying force in Cambodian society. Prime Minister Hun Sen gave praise to Sihamoni for honourably carrying out his role as a "symbol of national unity, stability, happiness and prosperity", noting his humanitarianism, as well as efforts in strengthening national prestige and fostering a "spirit of solidarity" amongst Cambodians. Similarly, de facto Leader of the Opposition Sam Rainsy, shares this sentiment, expressing admiration for his ability to bring people together in the national interest, although amid internal political developments that is seen as indicative of Democratic backsliding, this view held by Rainsy has not always been consistent, and it is within this juxtaposition, from a power politics analytical standpoint, that there are often divergent perspectives concerning the King, between those who implore for his active politicism and those who advocate he sustain his guarded Apoliticism.

Scholar Milton Osborne, regarded as amongst the world’s most distinguished authors specializing in Southeast Asia, commends him as a "dedicated servant of his people" that is "cultured and disciplined”, but he questions the survival of the monarchical institution in a post-Sihamoni era. This is in part, due to past political instability, including historical tensions between the royal family and Prime Minister Hun Sen. However, in recent years, Prime Minister Sen has given steadfast assurances which therefore signals his government's intent to preserve the monarchy long into the future. Prominent Cambodian history professor, Sambo Manara credits Sihamoni as a "morale model" for all Khmer people whom exudes a calm and kind demeanor, underscored by a sincere warmth towards his subjects, notwithstanding some misconceived notions about the King’s role from within some sectors of the population, in particular, the youth demographic.

Reflecting after a royal audience with the King in 2013, then International Monetary Fund Managing Director Christine Lagarde, expressed how she was profoundly touched by his "thoughtfulness and compassion" and how he "not only cares deeply about the welfare of his people, but is clearly passionately devoted to promoting the cultural and artistic heritage of his country." On the occasion of his 68th birthday, ASEAN described King Sihamoni as a monarch who is "cherished and well-respected by the people of Cambodia" and as someone who exemplifies "dignified and humbled leadership", characterized by his frequent engagements with the populace through local visitations. The King's birthday on 14 May in conjunction with his coronation day on 29 October are both annual public holidays in Cambodia and in 2019, a special commemorative 15,000 riel was issued in his honour, celebrating the 15th anniversary of his tenure as sovereign. Sihamoni is also featured on the 500, 10,000, 20,000 and 100,000 riels respectively and his portrait, alongside the King-father and Queen-mother is prominent across many parts of the country, illustrative of their highly revered status.

Lèse-majesté
In February 2018, the penal code was formally revised to incorporate Lèse-majesté legislation, which makes it an offence to insult the king, pursuant to its promulgation by Cambodia's National Assembly and Senate and the law came into effect the following month. Human rights groups had voiced concerns that the law may be potentially used to suppress political opponents of the government and considered it to be incompatible with respect to the freedom of speech, though the Ministry of Justice maintains that the law is necessary in protecting the monarchy from people who push the boundaries of said freedom. After this law was enacted, there have been seldom arrests, charges  and convictions, with the most notable case being that of Opposition Leader Sam Rainsy. Prior to this legislative enactment, the constitution did acknowledge the “inviolability” of the monarch and this constitutional provision was tested in 2017, when the Ministry of Interior pursued charges against a few individuals who was indignant towards the King on Social media.

Personal life
The King is a bachelor and has no children. As Cambodia is not a hereditary monarchy, but rather an elective monarchy, his future successor will be determined by the Royal Council of the Throne, chosen from the lineage of one of the two royal houses of Cambodia, in accordance with the country's constitution. His parents, King-Father Norodom Sihanouk and Queen-Mother Norodom Monineath, when questioned about Sihamoni's marital status, once remarked that he was uninterested in relationships and is instead, rather committed to a monastic way of life, underpinned by Buddhist principles. In some respects, Sihamoni is regarded somewhat as an enigmatic figure, with the available literature pointing to a "reflective, deliberate and cultured man" who apparently had reservations in becoming King, yet in spite of this, humbly assumed the solemn responsibility of his position, whilst holding "his cards close to his chest."

Interests
Apart from his interest in the arts and culture, which is well-documented, it is reported that the king "is a man of simple tastes." Purportedly, in his free time he enjoys the peace of meditation, reading, exercising, listening to classical music such as by the likes of Beethoven and observance to traditional Buddhist rituals. In addition, it is reported that he enjoys comedy films, is the occasional fan of chocolates, and likes to keep up with current events and news, balancing his personal interests with that of his busy and strict schedule as head of state. His commitment to the duties of a monarch could be seen in 2011 where he famously declined to attend the royal wedding of then Kate Middleton and Prince William, which the British tabloids headlined as a "snub." This was quickly refuted by Ministry of Foreign Affairs officials who informed that a declination notification was indeed advised and that no snub occurred whatsoever. Moreover, alongside having an interest in DVDs relating to ballet and opera in general, he is also skilled at playing the piano and is reputedly a keen reader of reviews covering the Czech theatre scene.

Languages
Besides his native Khmer, Norodom Sihamoni speaks Czech fluently, the only ruling monarch in the world to do so. The king is also fluent in French and is a conversational speaker of English and Russian. He has basic fluency in Mandarin as well.

Filmography

Then Prince Sihamoni during the 1960s and 1990s starred in a few films, mainly directed by his father, who was a prolific and accomplished film-maker. He has also been the subject of documentaries and directed a few films himself.

Titles and styles

Before he was crowned king, his princely royal title was: Sdech Krom Khun, or His Royal Highness Sdech Krom Khun Norodom Sihamoni, equating him to the rank of "Great Prince."

As King, his full regnal title is: Preah Karuna Preah Bat Sâmdach Preah Bâromneath Norodom Sihamoni Saman Bhumichat Sasana Rakkhata Khattiya Khmeraratrat Putthintra Mohaksat Khemareacheana Samuhobhas Kampuchea Ekareacharath Bureanasanti Subheamagala Sirivibunla Khmera Sri Bireat Preah Chao Krung Kampuchea Dhibodi (in romanized Khmer);  roughly translating to: "His Merciful Excellent Majesty Protector, King Norodom Sihamoni, who unites the nation, religion, realms, and people of Khmer state, the great king who is supported by Buddha and Indra, the protector of independence, unification, and peace, the Great King of the Kingdom of Cambodia". The King's shortened official title is: His Majesty Preah Bat Samdech Preah Boromneath Norodom Sihamoni, King of the Kingdom of Cambodia.

In 2015, he was bestowed the honorary title, Preah SriLoka Dhammika Raja, or "Virtuous King for the Propagation of Buddhism in the World", conferred to him at the Sixth Buddhist Summit in the year prior.

In the military context, he is styled as Supreme Commander of the Royal Khmer Armed Forces, in line with the country's constitution.

Patronages 
As King, Sihamoni has served as the patron of many causes and organizations as well as a range of NGOs and NPOs. This includes, but is not limited to the below list;

Heritage
 Honorary President of ICC-Angkor (International Coordination Committee for the Safeguarding and Development of Historic Site of Angkor)
 Baphuon Temple at Angkor Restoration Project - Patron
 Greater Angkor Collaborative Research Project - Patron
 Statue of St. John of Nepomuk in Divina, Slovakia - patron of the project of restoration (2017).

Cultural
 Member of the High Council of French-speaking Countries (2004).
 Foreign Associate Member of the Académie des Inscriptions et Belles-Lettres (2008).
 International Dance Day - Message Author (2006) 
 Mozart at Angkor Musical Showcase - Patron
 Center for Khmer Studies Library, Siem Reap - Patron
 The Nginn Karet Foundation for Cambodia (Preah Ream Buppha Devi NKFC Conservatoire)  
 Cambodian Living Arts - Patron
 Technicolour Foundation (MEMORY! International Film Heritage Festival) (2014) - Patron
 Cie Cabaret des Oiseaux - Patron 
 GoGo Cambodia world record-setting Krama initiative - Patron 
 Angkor Archaeological Park meditation centre - Patron
 First They Killed My Father - Patron of film
 L'ombrello di Beatocello - Patron of film

Community
 Cambodian Red Cross - Patron
 Krousar Thmey Foundation - 25th Anniversary Ceremony Honorary President
 Transcultural Psychosocial Organization (Cambodia) - Patron of 20th Anniversary and new Mental Health Treatment Center
 Kantha Bopha Foundation - Patron of 20th Anniversary & major benefactor
 Waltzing Around Cambodia Onlus - Patron
 Samdech Techo Project for Mine Action (STP-MA) - Patron
 Preah Sihamoniraja Buddhist University - Establishing Patron
 Sihanouk Hospital Center of Hope - Patron
 Calmette Hospital Neurology Center (Centre De Neurosciences) - Patron
 Teach Them To Fish Foundation - Patron

Environmental
 Airavata Elephant Foundation - Establishing Patron
 National Arbor Day - Patron

Honours

National honours
  Grand Cross of the Royal Order of Cambodia
  Grand Cross of the Royal Order of Monisaraphon

Foreign honours
 
  Grand Cross of the Order of the Legion of Honour (2006)
  Grand Officer of the Order of the Legion of Honour (2006)

 
  Collar and Grand Cordon of the Supreme Order of the Chrysanthemum (11 May 2010)

Ecumenical orders
 Order of Saint Lazarus: Grand Cross of Merit of the Order of Saint Lazarus (2008)

Awards
 : Gratias Agit Award of the Ministry of Foreign Affairs (2006)
 : Honorary Citizen of the City of Prague (2006)
 : Silver Medal of the City of Paris

Honorary degrees
 Academy of Performing Arts in Prague, Honorary Doctorate (19 March 2010)
 Naresuan University, Honorary Doctorate in Political Science (12 June 2015)
 St. Elizabeth University of Health and Social Sciences, Honorary Doctorate in Social Work

Honourific eponyms
 Dendrobium Norodom Sihamoni, an orchid named in honour of the King (30 March 2006)
 Preah Norodom Sihamoni Primary School, in Chhnuk Trou Commune, Baribour district
 Preah Norodom Sihamoni General and Technical Lycée, in Kampot Province
 Preah Bat Samdech Preah Boromneath Norodom Sihamoni General and Technical High School, in Aur Russei Commune, Kampong Tralach District
  Preah Sihamoniraja Buddhist University, in Phnom Penh
  Kantha Bopha-Sihamoni Monineath (Heart Surgery Centre II) at Kantha Bopha I Children’s Hospital, in Phnom Penh
 King Sihamoni Meditation Centre at Angkor Archaeological Park, Siem Reap province
 King Norodom Sihamoni Boulevard, in Siem Reap, Siem Reap province 
 King Norodom Sihamoni Avenue, in Siem Reap, Siem Reap province 
 King Norodom Sihamoni Road, in Siem Reap, Siem Reap province

Ancestry

References

Further reading

 Miroslav Nožina, Jiří Šitler, and Karel Kučera. Royal Ties: King Norodom Sihamoni and the History of Czech-Cambodian Relations. Prague: Knižní klub, 2006. 

 Julio A Jeldres. The Royal House of Cambodia [First edition]. Cambodia: Monument Books, 2003. ISBN 974-90881-0-8

 Julio A Jeldres. The Royal House of Cambodia [Second edition]. Cambodia: The Sleuk Rith Institute, 2017.

External links

 King Norodom Sihamoni – Official Website
 Article about Norodom Sihamoni's coronation by Antonio Graceffo
 Royal du Cambodge unofficial Instagram page dedicated to sharing Cambodian royal family news (in Khmer)

1953 births
Living people
Cambodian Buddhists
Cambodian Buddhist monarchs
21st-century Cambodian monarchs
Cambodian expatriates in France
Cambodian expatriates in Czechoslovakia
Cambodian people of Corsican descent
Cambodian people of French descent
Cambodian Theravada Buddhists
Children of prime ministers of Cambodia
Grand Croix of the Légion d'honneur
Knights Grand Cross of the Royal Order of Cambodia
House of Norodom
People from Phnom Penh
Cambodian people of Italian descent
Permanent Delegates of Cambodia to UNESCO
Members of the Royal Order of Monisaraphon